The canton of Saint-Lyé is an administrative division of the Aube department, northeastern France. It was created at the French canton reorganisation which came into effect in March 2015. Its seat is in Saint-Lyé.

It consists of the following communes:
 
Avant-lès-Marcilly
Avon-la-Pèze
Barberey-Saint-Sulpice
Bercenay-le-Hayer
Bourdenay
Charmoy
Dierrey-Saint-Julien
Dierrey-Saint-Pierre
Échemines
Faux-Villecerf
Fay-lès-Marcilly
La Fosse-Corduan
Macey
Marcilly-le-Hayer
Marigny-le-Châtel
Mesnil-Saint-Loup
Montgueux
Origny-le-Sec
Orvilliers-Saint-Julien
Ossey-les-Trois-Maisons
Le Pavillon-Sainte-Julie
Payns
Pouy-sur-Vannes
Prunay-Belleville
Rigny-la-Nonneuse
Saint-Flavy
Saint-Loup-de-Buffigny
Saint-Lupien
Saint-Lyé
Saint-Martin-de-Bossenay
Trancault
Villadin
Villeloup

References

Cantons of Aube